Páramo Directional Clothing is a British outdoor clothing company.  It was founded by Nick Brown, who also started the Nikwax waterproofing products company.

Background 
During the 1980s, Nick Brown became convinced that there was a fundamental flaw in the way waterproof fabrics commonly used in outdoor clothing worked, in the humid and cool, but not cold, environment in Britain. This is because the fabrics rely on a temperature and humidity gradient in order to breathe. These ideas led to the development of Nikwax Analogy fabrics. 
Páramo Directional Clothing was founded as a company to make clothing based on the Nikwax Analogy technologies.

Ethics 
Páramo utilises a charitable manufacturing facility in Bogota, Colombia to produce all of its technical products. The factory was begun in conjunction with a local foundation and provides skills and jobs for 'at risk women', generally women who would otherwise be involved in prostitution or illegal drug use.
In addition to the socially ethical elements of the Páramo business model, it has committed to minimizing its environmental impact, and all of the products are designed to be robust and repairable to last a very long time. To this end there is a policy of not using fabrics like Nylon which is not as chemically stable as Polyester in the main construction of any waterproof garments. Because of the Nikwax technologies employed none of the cleaning or treatment products used to produce or maintain Páramo products are environmentally persistent or toxic. Páramo does not use any fluoro-carbons, either as a DWR treatment or as a waterproof barrier.
Páramo also works with The World Land Trust on conservation efforts and carbon offsetting of all aspects of its operations.

Other products 
Páramo has also added non-waterproof elements to its product line, including light weight travel clothing and over-layering synthetic insulation for use in cold and wet conditions.

Reception

Positives 
There is a cult following among hill walkers, mountaineers (particularly in northern England and Scotland), certain parts of UK Armed Forces, divisions of the UK Police and Mountain Rescue Teams for Páramo waterproofs. 
Generally the garment designs are well received from a utility perspective. 
The waterproofs can often be carried instead of separate fleece and shell garments, reducing carried load.
Páramo provide multiple lengths of leg for most styles of waterproof trousers in the range.
The use of wash-in water repellant treatments means easy maintenance and long functional life for the fabrics.

Negatives 

Nikwax Analogy fabrics, by nature of their two-layer construction, are generally heavier than competing systems which mainly use a monolithic impermeable layer commonly based on Polyurethane or ePTFE. This is often considered to be a major drawback in both lightweight backpacking and certain climbing applications. While effectively waterproof, Nikwax Analogy fabrics are not impermeable, meaning that application of enough pressure to counteract the capillary depression effect can cause garments to leak. The requirement to maintain garments, i.e. to clean and proof them, is seen as a downside as it makes the user more responsible for the performance of the item. This also seen as an advantage from some perspectives. 
Many of the designs have been criticised for being old fashioned or unattractive. For many years Páramo only made garments in one or two colours and has had a mixed record in production of colours to appeal to a mainstream market. 
The nature of the technologies used means that there is no 'entry level' product in the range, requiring a significant financial commitment from a customer to try the system in the first place.

External links 

 Official website of Paramo

References

Clothing companies of the United Kingdom
Companies based in East Sussex
Outdoor clothing brands
Science and technology in East Sussex
Wealden District